Events from the year 2009 in the United Arab Emirates.

Incumbents
President: Khalifa bin Zayed Al Nahyan 
Prime Minister: Mohammed bin Rashid Al Maktoum

Events

February
 February 11 - An oil tanker and a container ship collide off the coast of Dubai.

References

 
Years of the 21st century in the United Arab Emirates
United Arab Emirates
United Arab Emirates
2000s in the United Arab Emirates